Geraldo João Paulo Roger Verdier (28 March 1937 – 22 October 2017) was a Roman Catholic bishop.

Verdier was ordained to the priesthood in 1963. He served as bishop of the Diocese of Guajará-Mirim, Brazil from 1980 to 2011.

See also
Catholic Church in Brazil

Notes

1937 births
2017 deaths
21st-century Roman Catholic bishops in Brazil
Deaths from cerebrovascular disease
20th-century Roman Catholic bishops in Brazil
Roman Catholic bishops of Guajará-Mirim